A proxy list is a list of open HTTP/HTTPS/SOCKS proxy servers all on one website. Proxies allow users to make indirect network connections to other computer network services. Proxy lists include the IP addresses of computers hosting open proxy servers, meaning that these proxy servers are available to anyone on the internet. Proxy lists are often organized by the various proxy protocols the servers use. Many proxy lists index Web proxies, which can be used without changing browser settings.

Proxy Anonymity Levels 
 Elite proxies - Such proxies do not change request fields and look like a real browser, and your real IP address is hidden. Server administrators will commonly be fooled into believing that you are not using a proxy.
 Anonymous proxies - These proxies do not show a real IP address, however, they do change the request fields, therefore it is very easy to detect that a proxy is being used by log analysis. You are still anonymous, but some server administrators may restrict proxy requests.
 Transparent proxies - (not anonymous, simply HTTP) - These change the request fields and they transfer the real IP. Such proxies are not applicable for security or privacy uses while surfing the web, and should only be used for network speed improvement.

SOCKS is a protocol that relays TCP sessions through a firewall host to allow application users transparent access across the firewall. Because the protocol is independent of application protocols, it can be (and has been) used for many different services, such as telnet, FTP, finger, whois, gopher, WWW, etc. Access control can be applied at the beginning of each TCP session; thereafter the server simply relays the data between the client and the application server, incurring minimum processing overhead. Since SOCKS never has to know anything about the application protocol, it should also be easy for it to accommodate applications that use encryption to protect their traffic from nosy snoopers. No information about the client is sent to the server – thus there is no need to test the anonymity level of the SOCKS proxies.

External links

 
 

Computer network security
Computer networking
Internet privacy
Computer security software